This is a list of original programming by Disney Channel in India.

Original shows

Movies

Disney XD original series
 Chorr Police (2009-2012)
 Luv Kushh (2012-2014)
 Mysteries and Feluda (2011)
 P5 - Pandavas 5 (2011-2012)
 The Adventures of King Vikram (2012-2014)
 Howzzattt (2012)

Hungama TV original series
 Hero - Bhakti Hi Shakti Hai  (2005–2007)
Zoran (2007)

Footnotes

Videos
"All for One (Aaja Nachle)" from High School Musical 2
"Ud Chale" from High School Musical 2 
"Ek Hai Hum (All for One)" from High School Musical 2
"Shake it Up" (Medley of songs "Shake It Up", "Bezubaan" and "Sorry Sorry") from Shake It Up and ABCD: Any Body Can Dance
"Happy Birthday Mickey" (Bollywood celebrities Ranbir Kapoor, Deepika Padukone, Sushant Singh Rajput, Jacqueline Fernandez, Meet Bros, Sunidhi Chauhan, Varun Dhawan, Shraddha Kapoor, Anushka Sharma, Alia Bhatt, Amit Trivedi, Shaan, Nargis Fakhri, Riteish Deshmukh, Aditya Roy Kapur, Tiger Shroff, Sidharth Malhotra and Kailash Kher wishing Mickey Mouse Happy Birthday)
"Sab Sahi Hai Bro" (Promotional song for Aladdin's indian release performed by Badshah)

See also
List of programs broadcast by Disney Channel (India)
List of programs broadcast by Hungama TV
List of Disney television films

References 

Disney
Disney India

Disney Channel related-lists